Auspicious is a Latin-derived word originally pertaining to the taking of 'auspices' by the augurs of ancient Rome. It may refer to:
 Luck
 Auspicious number in numerology
 Eight auspicious symbols; see Ashtamangala
 Auspicious wedding date
 Auspicious train ticket
 In English discourse on aspects of Chinese culture, the word "auspicious" is a significant concept in:
 Chinese New Year
 Numbers in Chinese culture
 Feng shui
 The Song to the Auspicious Cloud, an anthem of the Republic of China
 In Tibetan Buddhism:
 Great Auspicious Beauty, one of the Seventeen Tantras of Menngagde
 In Thai culture:
 The Ancient and Auspicious Order of the Nine Gems; see Order of the Nine Gems
 The Most Auspicious Order of the Rajamitrabhorn; see Order of the Rajamitrabhorn
 The Auspicious Incident, an event in the history of the Ottoman Empire

See also
 Faust (Latin: faustus, lit. 'favorable', 'fortunate' or 'auspicious'), the protagonist of a classic German legend based on the historical Johann Georg Faust
 Shiva (Sanskrit: शिव, romanized: Śiva, lit. 'The Auspicious One'), one of the principal deities of Hinduism